Patricia Polifka (born 8 November 1984 in Gera, East Germany) is a German bobsledder who has competed since 2005. She was a push athlete for Claudia Schramm during the 2006/07 season, alongside Stephanie Szczurek and Nicole Herschmann.  She won a gold in the mixed team event at the 2009 FIBT World Championships in Lake Placid, New York. She finished seventh in the two-woman event at those same championships.

Polifka's best World Cup finish was second in the two-woman event at Altenberg, Germany in 2006.

References
 (FIBT profile) http://www.fibt.com/index.php?id=47&tx_bzdstaffdirectory_pi1%5BshowUid%5D=100214&tx_bzdstaffdirectory_pi1%5BbackPid%5D=63&L=0

1984 births
Living people
Sportspeople from Gera
People from Bezirk Gera
German female bobsledders
20th-century German women